In the social sciences, the free-rider problem is a type of market failure that occurs when those who benefit from resources, public goods and common pool resources do not pay for them or under-pay. Examples of such goods are public roads or public libraries or services or other goods of a communal nature. Free riders are a problem for common pool resources because they may overuse it by not paying for the good (either directly through fees or tolls or indirectly through taxes). Consequently, the common pool resource may be under-produced overused or degraded. Additionally, it has been shown that despite evidence that people tend to be cooperative by nature (a prosocial behaviour), the presence of free-riders causes cooperation to deteriorate, perpetuating the free-rider problem. 

The free-rider problem in social science is the question of how to limit free riding and its negative effects in these situations. Such an example is the free-rider problem of when property rights are not clearly defined and imposed. The free-rider problem is common with public goods which are non-excludable and non-rivalrous. Non-excludable means that non-payers cannot be stopped from getting use of or benefits from the good. Non-rival consumption stipulates that the use of a good or service by one consumer does not reduce its availability for another consumer. These characteristics of a public good result in there being little incentive for consumers to contribute to a collective resource as they enjoy its benefits.

A free rider may enjoy a non-excludable and non-rivalrous good such as a government-provided road system without contributing to paying for it. Another example is if a coastal town builds a lighthouse, ships from many regions and countries will benefit from it, even though they are not contributing to its costs, and are thus "free riding" on the navigation aid. A third example of non-excludable and non-rivalrous consumption would be a crowd watching fireworks. The number of viewers, whether they paid for the entertainment or not, does not diminish the fireworks as a resource. In each of these examples, the cost of excluding non-payers would be prohibitive, while the collective consumption of the resource does not decrease how much is available.

Although the term "free rider" was first used in economic theory of public goods, similar concepts have been applied to other contexts, including collective bargaining, antitrust law, psychology, political science, and vaccines. For example, some individuals in a team or community may reduce their contributions or performance if they believe that one or more other members of the group may free ride.

Incentive
The underlying incentive which generates the free-rider problem can be explained via the application of the Prisoner's dilemma, within the context of contributing to a public good. Suppose two people were to split a contribution to a public service (such as for a police station) with society benefiting from their contribution. According to the Prisoner's dilemma, certain conclusions can be drawn from the results of this scenario. If both parties donate, they are out of pocket and society benefits. If one party doesn't pay (in the hopes that someone else will) they become a free-rider, and the other will have to cover the cost. If the other party also decides to become a free-rider and neither pay, then society receives no benefit. This demonstrates that the free-rider problem is generated by individuals' willingness to let others pay when they themselves can receive the benefit at zero cost. This is reinforced by the economic theory of rational choice, stating that humans make choices which provide them with the greatest benefit. Therefore, if a service or resource is offered for free, then a consumer will not pay for it.

Economic issues 
Free riding is a problem of economic inefficiency when it leads to the underproduction or overconsumption of a good. For example, when people are asked how much they value a particular public good, with that value measured in terms of how much money they would be willing to pay, their tendency is to under-report their valuations. Goods that are subject to free riding are usually characterized by: the inability to exclude non-payers, its consumption by an individual does not impact the availability for others and that the resource in question must be produced and/or maintained. Indeed, if non-payers can be excluded by some mechanism, the good may be transformed into a club good (e.g. if an overused, congested public road is converted to a toll road, or if a free public museum turns into a private, admission fee-charging museum). 

Free riders become a problem when non-excludable goods are also rivalrous. These goods, categorized as common-pool resources,are characterized by overconsumption when common property regimes are not implemented. Not only can consumers of common-property goods benefit without payment, but consumption by one imposes an opportunity cost on others. The theory of 'Tragedy of the commons' highlights this, in which each consumer acts to maximize their own utility and thereby relies on others to cut back their own consumption. This will lead to overconsumption and even possibly exhaustion or destruction of the good. If too many people start to free ride, a system or service will eventually not have enough resources to operate. Free-riding is experienced when the production of goods does not consider the external costs, particularly the use of ecosystem services.

An example of this is global climate change initiatives. As climate change is a global issue and there is no global regime to manage the climate, the benefits of reduced emissions in one country will extend beyond their own countries' borders and impact countries worldwide. However, this has resulted in some countries acting in their own self-interest, limiting their own efforts and free-riding on the work of others. In some countries, citizens and governments do not wish to contribute to the associated  effort and costs of mitigation, as they are able to free-ride on the efforts of others. This free rider problem also raises questions in regards to the fairness and ethicalness of these practices, as countries most likely to suffer the consequences of climate change, are also those who typically emit the least greenhouse gases and have fewer economic resources to contribute to the efforts, such as the small island country of Tuvalu.

Theodore Groves and John Ledyard believe that Pareto-optimal allocation of resources in relation to public goods is not compatible with the fundamental incentives belonging to individuals. Therefore, the free-rider problem, according to most scholars, is expected to be an ongoing public issue. For example, Albert O. Hirschman believed that the free-rider problem is a cyclical one for capitalist economies. Hirschman considers the free-rider problem to be related to the shifting interests of people. When stress levels rise on individuals in the workplace and many fear losing their employment, they devote less of their human capital to the public sphere. When public needs then increase, disenchanted consumers become more interested in collective action projects. This leads individuals to organize themselves in various groups and the results are attempts to solve public problems. In effect this reverses the momentum of free riding. Activities often seen as costs in models focused on self-interest are instead seen as benefits for the individuals who were previously dissatisfied consumers seeking their private interests.

This cycle will reset itself because as individuals' work for public benefit becomes less praiseworthy, supporters' level of commitment to collective action projects will decrease. With the decrease in support, many will return to private interests, which with time resets the cycle. Supporters of Hirschman's model insist that the important factor in motivating people is that they are compelled by a leader's call to altruism. In John F. Kennedy's inaugural address he implored the American people to "ask not what your country can do for you; ask what you can do for your country." Some economists (for example, Milton Friedman) find these calls to altruism to be nonsensical. Scholars like Friedman do not think the free-rider problem is part of an unchangeable virtuous or vicious circle, but instead seek possible solutions or attempts at improvement elsewhere.

Economic and political solutions

Assurance contracts 

An assurance contract is a contract in which participants make a binding pledge to contribute to building a public good, contingent on a quorum of a predetermined size being reached.  Otherwise the good is not provided and any monetary contributions are refunded.

A dominant assurance contract is a variation in which an entrepreneur creates the contract and refunds the initial pledge plus an additional sum of money if the quorum is not reached. The entrepreneur profits by collecting a fee if the quorum is reached and the good is provided. In game-theoretic terms this makes pledging to build the public good a dominant strategy: the best move is to pledge to the contract regardless of the actions of others.

Coasian solution 
A Coasian solution, named for the economist Ronald Coase, proposes that potential beneficiaries of a public good can negotiate to pool their resources and create it, based on each party's self-interested willingness to pay. His treatise, The Problem of Social Cost (1960), argued that if the transaction costs between potential beneficiaries of a public good are low—that it is easy for potential beneficiaries to find each other and organize pooling their resources based upon the good's value to each of them—that public goods could be produced without government action.

Much later, Coase himself wrote that while what had become known as the Coase Theorem had explored the implications of zero-transaction costs, he had actually intended to use this construct as a stepping stone to understand the real world of positive transaction costs, corporations, legal systems and government actions:I examined what would happen in a world in which transaction costs were assumed to be zero. My aim in doing so was not to describe what life would be like in such a world but to provide a simple setting in which to develop the analysis and, what was even more important, to make clear the fundamental role which transaction costs do, and should, play in the fashioning of the institutions which make up the economic system.Coase also wrote:The world of zero transaction costs has often been described as a Coasian world. Nothing could be further from the truth. It is the world of modern economic theory, one which I was hoping to persuade economists to leave.  What I did in "The Problem of Social Cost" was simply to shed light on some of its properties. I argued in such a world the allocation of resources would be independent of the legal position, a result which Stigler dubbed the "Coase theorem".Thus, while Coase himself appears to have considered the "Coase theorem" and Coasian solutions as simplified constructs to ultimately consider the real 20th-century world of governments and laws and corporations, these concepts have become attached to a world where transaction costs were much lower, and government intervention would unquestionably be less necessary.

A minor alternative, especially for information goods, is for the producer to refuse to release a good to the public until payment to cover costs is met. Author Stephen King, for instance, authored chapters of a new novel downloadable for free on his website while stating that he would not release subsequent chapters unless a certain amount of money was raised. Sometimes dubbed holding for ransom, this method of public goods production is a modern application of the street performer protocol for public goods production. Unlike assurance contracts, its success relies largely on social norms to ensure (to some extent) that the threshold is reached and partial contributions are not wasted.

One of the purest Coasian solutions today is the new phenomenon of Internet crowdfunding. Here rules are enforced by computer algorithms and legal contracts as well as social pressure.  For example, on the Kickstarter site, each funder authorizes a credit card purchase to buy a new product or receive other promised benefits, but no money changes hands until the funding goal is met. Because automation and the Internet so reduce the transaction costs for pooling resources, project goals of only a few hundred dollars are frequently crowdfunded, far below the costs of soliciting traditional investors.

Introducing an exclusion mechanism (club goods) 

Another solution, which has evolved for information goods, is to introduce exclusion mechanisms which turn public goods into club goods. One well-known example is copyright and patent laws. These laws, which in the 20th century came to be called intellectual property laws, attempt to remove the natural non-excludability by prohibiting reproduction of the good. Although they can address the free rider problem, the downside of these laws is that they imply private monopoly power and thus are not Pareto-optimal.

For example, in the United States, the patent rights given to pharmaceutical companies encourage them to charge high prices (above marginal cost) and to advertise to convince patients to persuade their doctors to prescribe the drugs.  Likewise, copyright provides an incentive for a publisher to act like The Dog in the Manger, taking older works out of print so as not to cannibalize revenue from the publisher's own new works. Examples from the entertainment industry include Walt Disney Studios Home Entertainment's "vault" sales practice. Examples from the computer software industry include Microsoft's decision to pull Windows XP from the market in mid-2008 to drive revenue from the widely criticized Windows Vista operating system.

The laws also end up encouraging patent and copyright owners to sue even mild imitators in court and to lobby for the extension of the term of the exclusive rights in a form of rent seeking.

These problems with the club-good mechanism arise because the underlying marginal cost of giving the good to more people is low or zero, but, because of the limits of price discrimination those who are unwilling or unable to pay a profit-maximizing price do not gain access to the good. If the costs of the exclusion mechanism are not higher than the gain from the collaboration, club goods can emerge naturally. James M. Buchanan showed in his seminal paper that clubs can be an efficient alternative to government interventions. On the other hand, the inefficiencies and inequities of club goods exclusions sometimes cause potentially excludable club goods to be treated as public goods, and their production financed by some other mechanism. Examples of such "natural" club goods include natural monopolies with very high fixed costs, private golf courses, cinemas, cable television and social clubs. This explains why many such goods are often provided or subsidized by governments, co-operatives or volunteer associations, rather than being left to be supplied by profit-minded entrepreneurs. These goods are often known as social goods. Joseph Schumpeter claimed that the "excess profits", or profits over normal profit, generated by the copyright or patent monopoly will attract competitors that will make technological innovations and thereby end the monopoly. This is a continual process referred to as "Schumpeterian creative destruction", and its applicability to different types of public goods is a source of some controversy. The supporters of the theory point to the case of Microsoft, for example, which has been increasing its prices (or lowering its products' quality), predicting that these practices will make increased market shares for Linux and Apple largely inevitable.

A nation can be seen as a "club" whose members are its citizens. Government would then be the manager of this club. This is further studied in the theory of the state.

Non-alturistic social sanctions (common property regimes)
Often on the foundation of game theory, experimental literature suggests that free-riding situations can be improved without any state intervention by seeking to measure the effects of various forms of social sanctions. Peer-to-peer punishment, that is, when members sanction other members that do not contribute to the common pool resource by inflicting a cost on "free-riders", is considered sufficient to establish and maintain cooperation. 

Social actions come at a cost to the punisher, which discourages individuals from taking action to punish the free-rider. Therefore, punishers often need to be rewarded for following through with their punishment for the resource to be effectively managed. Unlike a prisoner's dilemma where the prisoners are prohibited from communicating and strategizing, people can get together to form "common property regimes" in which the group weighs the costs and benefits of rewarding individuals for sanctioning free riders. So long as the benefits of preserving the resource outweigh the cost of communication and enforcement, members often compensate punishers for sanctioning free riders. While the outcome is not Pareto-optimal, as the group has the additional cost of paying for enforcement, it is often less costly than letting the resource deplete. In the limiting case, where the costs of bargaining and enforcement approach zero, the setup becomes Coasian as the solution approaches the Pareto-optimal solution. 

Both punishment and regulation by the state work relatively badly under imperfect information, where people cannot observe the behavior of others.
 Often common property regimes which members establish through bargaining have more information about the specific common pool resource which they are managing than outsiders. For this reason, and because common property regimes can avoid the principal-agent problem, the specific local knowledge within common property regimes typically enables them to outperform regulations designed by outside technical experts. Nevertheless, the best performance is typically achieved when people in common property regimes consult with governments and technical experts while deciding on the rules and design of their firm, thereby combining local and technical knowledge.

Altruistic solutions

Social norms 
Psychologically, humans are fundamentally considered as free-riders by others only when benefits are consumed while contributions are withheld. Indicating that in all cultures free-riders are recognised, however, cultural differences exist in the degree of tolerance and how these people dealt with them. The impact of social norms on the free-rider problem differs between cultural contexts, which may lead to a variance between results in research on the free-rider problem when applied cross-culturally. Social norms impact on privately and voluntarily provided public goods; however, is considered to have some level of effect on the problem in many contexts. Social sanctioning, for example, is a norm in and of itself that has a high degree of universality. The goal of much research on the topic of social sanctioning and its effect on the free-rider problem is to explain the altruistic motivation that is observed in various societies.

Free riding is often thought of only in terms of positive and negative externalities felt by the public. The impact of social norms on actions and motivations related to altruism are often underestimated in economic solutions and the models from which they are derived.

Altruistic social sanctions 
While non-altruistic social sanctions occur when people establish common property regimes, people sometimes punish free-riders even without being rewarded. The exact nature of motivation remains to be explored. Whether costly punishment can explain cooperation is disputed. Recent research finds that costly punishment is less effective in real world environments. 

Other research finds that social sanctions cannot be generalized as strategic in the context of public goods. Preferences between secret sanctions (untraceable sanctions between players in the game) and standard sanctions (traceable sanctions including feedback between players in an otherwise identical environment) on free riders did not vary significantly. Rather some individuals preferred to sanction others regardless of secrecy. Other research build on the findings of behavioral economics, finds that in a dilemmatic donation game, donators are motivated by the fear of loss. In the game donators' deposits were only refunded if the donators always punish free riding and non-commitment among other individuals. Pool-punishment (everyone loses their deposit if one donator doesn't punish the free rider) provided more stable results than punishment without consideration of the consensus of the group. Individual-to-individual peer punishment led to less consistently applied social sanctions. Collectively this research, although it is experimental in nature, may prove useful when applied in public policy decisions seeking to improve free-rider problems within society.

See also

 Common pool resource
 Economic surplus
 Freedom Riders
 Forced rider
 Leech (computing)
 The Logic of Collective Action
 Moral hazard
 Parasitism (social offense)
 Prisoner's dilemma
 Tragedy of the commons

Notes

Further reading
 
 William D. Nordhaus, "A New Solution:  the Climate Club" (a review of Gernot Wagner and Martin L. Weitzman, Climate Shock:  The Economic Consequences of a Hotter Planet, Princeton University Press, 250 pp, $27.95), The New York Review of Books, vol. LXII, no. 10 (June 4, 2015), pp. 36–39.
 
 P. Oliver – Sociology 626 published by Social Science Computing Cooperative University of Wisconsin

Market failure
Tragedy of the commons
Dilemmas